The 1906 Tennessee Volunteers football team represented the University of Tennessee in the 1906 college football season.  James DePree served his second and final season as head coach at Tennessee.  Roscoe Word, a three time captain for the Volunteers, became the team's first assistant coach.

Schedule

References

Tennessee
Tennessee Volunteers football seasons
Tennessee Volunteers football